"Modern Men" is an episode of the BBC sitcom Only Fools and Horses. It was the second episode of the 1996 Christmas trilogy and the fourteenth Christmas special, first screened on 27 December 1996. In the episode, Del Boy is a reading a new lifestyle book, Modern Man. Later, Cassandra suffers a miscarriage.

Synopsis
Due to the good news of Cassandra and Rodney expecting a baby, the Trotters go for a night out at the Nag's Head.

At the Nag's Head, Del Boy is able to convince Mike to accept £5 for a trayful of drinks as well as sell him a "hairdryer" (actually an electric paint stripper) by doing the "I can make you turn your hands over without touching you" trick. Mickey Pearce then reminds Rodney that he needs to get a proper job before his and Cassandra's child is born (Rodney accidentally quit his last job in "The Chance of a Lunchtime").

Later that night, while they are in bed, Del shows Raquel a new book he bought called "Modern Man", which Del thinks will turn him into a debonair when he meets Raquel's parents in the near future. Raquel then requests that Del give Rodney a proper job because of his impending fatherhood.

Meanwhile, while they are in bed, Rodney tells Cassandra that Del has to stop making impulsive decisions. Del, however, has decided to have a vasectomy.

The next morning at Nelson Mandela House, Rodney tells Albert about a job advert in the paper for a successful company. He picks up the phone and dials the company, but does not realise that he has called Del's new mobile phone. Del takes part in the conversation with the false identity of "Ivor Hardy" and talking in a strong Welsh accent, as well as explaining what his company sells; "anything it can get its hands on", and Rodney's job is to take the stuff to the market and sell it from a suitcase. Del enters the lounge and says in his own voice, "We're always on the lookout for dirty little plonkers like you!" Rodney realises that the job he wanted is already his, and that Del only placed that ad in the newspaper so that someone could help him while Rodney looks for a real job. Del accuses Rodney of trying to get rid of him when Rodney said that he had not got a brother to Del. Completely understanding about his younger brother's worried pride, Del promotes Rodney to Sales Director.

The Trotter Brothers go to Sid's café to avoid a Sikh medic named Dr. Singh, who is looking for Del because of the faulty paint (whose expiration date was June 1983) he sold him. Del tells Rodney that he is getting a vasectomy, much to his younger brother's disgust.

Sometime later, Del is in a medical clinic, ready for his vasectomy, and Dr. Singh is going to operate on him. Del screams loudly, and wakes up back in his own bed with Raquel. Del then decides to not have the vasectomy after all, and goes back to sleep.

The next day, upon returning from the market, Rodney teases Del for backing out of the vasectomy. At that moment, Dr. Singh appears and demands that Del get rid of the faulty paint he sold him immediately. As the doctor leaves on a motor scooter, Del comments about him not wearing a crash helmet because of his turban. Rodney explains that it is a genuine legal exemption under UK law, which gives Del an idea.

At 5:30pm that afternoon, Rodney is shown wearing a horse riding helmet with Raquel's scarf on it, which Del calls a "Trotter Crash Turban". Raquel and Rodney believe that the product will never catch on, while Albert receives a phone call for Rodney from Cassandra's bank informing them that Cassandra suffered a miscarriage.

The Trotter Brothers quickly drive to the hospital and ask the sister about which room Cassandra is in. As they head off, a drunken man in the waiting room is harassing the hospital staff and its patients.

As Del and Rodney arrive at Cassandra's room in theatre gowns, Del tells Rodney that he has to be patient and supportive as well as talk about the future, not the past or present. The Trotter Brothers enter, and Cassandra tearfully apologise. To Rodney's surprise, Del begins to cry uncontrollably. Rodney tries his best to calm his wife and tell her that things just happen. Del agrees and leaves the room tearfully. Cassandra then says that she lost the baby, but Rodney tells her that they will get through this. Cassandra smiles sweetly and hugs her husband.

Back in the waiting room, the drunken man is still hassling the staff, and becomes even more abusive when Mike (who accidentally burned his forehead with the paint stripper Del sold him) is attended to before him. As Del enters the room to compose himself, he is offended by the drunken man's rudeness. Del silences the drunken man by punching him in the face. The impact from the hit causes the drunken man to sober up. Feeling relieved, Del says to a waiting patient, "I bet you wish you'd gone private!" then confidently leaves.

Episode cast

Music
 Oasis: "Roll with It"
 Louise: "Light of My Life"
 Boyzone: "Love Me for a Reason"
 Blur: "Country House"

External links

1996 British television episodes
Christmas television specials
Only Fools and Horses special episodes
Pregnancy-themed television episodes